The Liechtenstein Football Cup  is Liechtenstein's premier football competition, and has been organised annually by the Liechtenstein Football Association (LFV) since 1946. The winner qualifies to take part in the UEFA Europa Conference League.

As there is no national league in Liechtenstein, the Liechtenstein Football Cup is the only national football competition in the country. The country has only seven clubs, all of which historically have already established themselves in the Swiss league competitions. As none of the teams play in the top Swiss flight at this time, the national cup competition is currently the only route for Liechtenstein to be represented at the European football club competitions.

Competition format
The competition has an unusual format in that not only can the first teams of the main seven football clubs enter, but also the reserve sides, which all play in lower divisions in the Swiss league system. This can lead to some unusual scenarios, such as in the second round of the 2006–07 cup, where FC Triesenberg's second team went through, but the first team was knocked out.

Teams from the same football club can be drawn together in any round of the competition.  In the 2009–10 competition semi-final stage, USV Eschen/Mauren were drawn with USV Eschen/Mauren II, and again in 2022-23 semi-finals, where FC Balzers were drawn with FC Balzers II.

Teams are seeded based on the performance in the previous year's competition, and the seeding determines which round the team will start the competition in.

List of winners

Records
A list of all Liechtenstein clubs reflecting their success in the Liechtenstein Cup after 77 competitions (from 1946 to 2022 inclusive).

"League Tier" indicates in which tier of the Swiss Football League the clubs are active (status: season 2021–22).

References

External links
Official website
Cup at uefa.com
Cup at soccerway.com

 
National association football cups
Cup